The 2023 Pan American Games, officially the XIX Pan American Games and commonly known as Santiago 2023, is a forthcoming international multi-sport event governed by the Panam Sports Organization, scheduled to be held in Santiago, Chile from 20 October to 5 November 2023. These are the first Pan American Games to be held in Chile, and the eighth to be held in South America.

The games are scheduled to be held in 39 venues across in the Santiago Metropolitan Region and three other regions of Chile. The Pan American Games and the 2023 Parapan American Games were organized by the Santiago Organizing Committee for the 2023 Pan and Parapan American Games.

Bidding process

Two bids were submitted for the 2023 Pan American Games. Santiago, Chile and Buenos Aires, Argentina both submitted bids. On February 1, 2017, the Pan American Sports Organization (now Panam Sports) announced the two cities as the official bids. Buenos Aires withdrew their bid in April 2017 due to not having the necessary finances or logistics to host this event and the 2018 Summer Youth Olympics.

Host city election
Santiago was unanimously elected as the host city at the ANOC General Assembly in Prague on November 4, 2017. This will mark the first time Chile hosts the Pan American Games. Santiago was initially awarded the right to host the 1975 and later 1987 Pan American Games, but withdrew as host both times due to financial and political problems. Most recently, Santiago was a candidate for the 2019 Pan American Games but lost to Lima.

Development and preparation

Financing
The budget for the games is $507 million USD, with $170 million reserved for the building of ten new sporting venues and the upgrade of six arenas. The budget is about 36% of what was spent for the 2015 Pan American Games in Toronto, Canada and 50% of the last Pan American Games in 2019, in Lima, Peru.

Venues

Various venues across Santiago and various other cities will be used for the games, including Viña del Mar, Valparaíso and Algarrobo. In March 2022, the first venue for the games was officially inaugurated: the field hockey stadium on the National Stadium Grounds.

In June 2022, organizers revealed the final venue plan consisting of 41 competition venues. 39 will be used for the Games, with the other two being used exclusively for the 2023 Parapan American Games. The venues span four regions of the country: Santiago, Valparaíso, O'Higgins and Biobío.

Athletes Village
In December 2021, a ceremony was held to lay the first brick for the village. The village is expected to cost approximately $100 million USD, and will consist of 1,345 apartments. After the games, the village will be converted to social housing. The village is being built in the Cerrillos Bicentennial Park community of Santiago.

The Games

Participating National Olympic Committees
All 41 nations who are members of the Pan American Sports Organization are expected to compete.

Sports
A total of 39 sports will be contested at the games. In March 2020, Panam Sports confirmed the sports program would consist of the 28 Olympic sports plus 4 PanAmerican Sports  baseball/softball, karate, roller sports (artistic, speed and skateboarding), water skiing, and surfing as optional sport leaving the possibility of more sports being added if no new infrastructure costs were added. In December 2020,another five sports were added to the program:as the PanAmerican Games charter determines: 4 more regional sports are added: basque pelota, bowling, racquetball and squash,along the sport climbing. Sport climbing and skateboarding will be making their debut appearances at the Pan American Games as due calendar and infrastructure problems they were not added to the Lima 2019 program. On June 24, 2022, the sport of breaking was added to the sport program. This will mark the sport's debut at the Pan American Games, and will serve as a Pan-American qualifier for the 2024 Summer Olympics in Paris, France. After making its debut at the last edition of the games, bodybuilding will not be contested at these games. On March 1, 2023, both PanAmSports and the Organizing Committee jointly announced the addition of Kyorugi events per team in taekwondo, responding to some requests from some National Olympic Committees.In this way, the taekwondo program will have 13 events disputed. Since in addition to the Olympic events, pomsae was already in the program since Lima 2019. Thus, the total of finals rose to 419.

Numbers in parentheses indicate the number of medal events to be contested in each sport/discipline.

Aquatics

Baseball

  

 
 

Volleyball

Media

Broadcasting
In February 2022,the spanish company Mediapro was announced as the host broadcaster for the games. This contract determines that all the 39 sports and disciplines will be televised live, for the first time in the history of the Pan American Games. Production costs estimates a total around US$12 million. Is expected that a total of 1900 hours of competition will be aired,more than double what was broadcast 4 years earlier when 900 hours were broadcast during 2019 Pan American Games in Lima, Peru. In September 2022, the country's public television broadcaster,TVN was named as the official broadcaster of the games in Chile. A few months later it was established that the broadcaster would not be able to handle the event on its own and the rights were offered to private broadcasters in the country.On February 16, 2023,it was reported that the duties and responsabilities to broadcaster and cover the event  would be shared by the channel and the private Canal 13, in order to give the best coverage throughout the host country.

Marketing

Logo and slogan
The logo was unveiled on July 17, 2019, at one of the Santiago High Performance Sports Center (CAR) that will serve as one of the legacies of the event in the country.
. Meanwhile, the slogan of the games "Dream, Play, Win" (Spanish: "Soñar, Jugar, Ganar") was unveiled in February 2022. Organizers chose the slogan because it "speaks to the experience of every athlete young and old".

Mascot
A public poll was held online between in August 2021 to choose a mascot for the Games. Five options, representing species native to Chile were the options: Fiu, a many-colored rush tyrant; Pewü, a pine nut from the Araucaria tree; Chitama, a runner lizard from the Atacama Region; Juanchi, a penguin; and Santi, a mythical winged South American puma. On October 16, 2021, Fiu was chosen as the official mascot of Santiago 2023.

Sponsorships
Multiple companies helped sponsor the 2023 Pan American Games.

Official sponsor
 Antofagasta Minerals
Mitsubishi Motors

Official providers
ADN
Cachantun
 PF Alimentos

Official supporters
Red Bull

Proud supporters
Michelob
Molten
Casillero del Diablo
Astara

Government partners
Senadis
 Marca Chile
Sernatur

See also
2022 South American Games
2023 Central American and Caribbean Games
2023 Parapan American Games
2024 Summer Olympics
2025 Junior Pan American Games

References

External links

PASO website

2023 Pan American Games
Pan American Games 2023
Pan American Games
Pan American Games
International sports competitions hosted by Chile
Multi-sport events in Chile
Sports competitions in Santiago
2023 in Chile
2023 in South American sport